No Other Way: Oxfordshire and the Spanish Civil War 1936-39 is a collection of short biographies detailing the lives of people from Oxfordshire, England, who fought against fascism during the Spanish Civil War. This book was the first ever attempt by historians to identify all the known volunteers with links to Oxfordshire who fought in the war, and was created through a collaboration between local Oxford historians and the International Brigade Memorial Trust (IBMT). The title "No Other Way" is a reference to a quote by Cecil Day-Lewis.

The forward contains an introduction to the Spanish Civil War written by Oxford University professor Tom Buchanan.

Creation and memorial 
The creation and sale of the book was used by the IBMT to raise funds for the first Spanish Civil War memorial in Oxfordshire. This campaign was a success partially thanks to the No Other Way book sales. The memorial was raised in 2017 with the erection of the Oxford Spanish Civil War memorial in South Park, Oxford.

Reception 
No Other Way received generally positive reviews.

Graham Stevenson, Britain's leading expert on the history of communist activism in Britain, gave an overwhelmingly positive review.

Professor of history at the Lancaster University Ben Edwards gave a positive review, although he lamented the fact that more references to the existing literature could have improved the work.

Peter Hill of the Oxford Left Review wrote a review detailing the ways in which the book's contents can be linked to modern Oxford.

Known volunteers 
No Other Way identified 31 individual people with links to Oxfordshire, England, who fought against fascism during the Spanish Civil War.
 Alfred Smith
 Alec Wainman
 Anthony Carritt
 Carl Marzani
 Christopher Thornycroft
 Claud Cockburn
 Dorothy Collier
 Edward Henry Burke Cooper
 Gavin Henderson, 2nd Baron Faringdon
 George Orwell
 Giles Romilly
 Herbert Fisher
 James (Jim) Brewer
 John (Jock) Birrell
 John Montgomery
 John Rickman
 Kathleen McColgan
 Lewis Clive
 Michael (Mike) Wilton
 Murray Fuhrman
 Nathan Clark
 Noel Carritt
 Peter Ferguson
 Peter Harrisson
 Philip Norman
 Ralph Winston Fox
 Robert Wheeler
 Thora Silverthorne
 Tom Wintringham
 Victor Claridge
 Wogan Philipps, 2nd Baron Milford

Missing biographies 
Despite attempts by the writers to include every known volunteer, historians have since discovered two more volunteers who were previously undiscovered. Their names are:

 Charlie Hutchison - The only known Black-British man to have fought in the Spanish Civil War.
 Liesel Carritt - A German-Jewish refugee who had fled to Oxford with her family to escape the Nazis.

In recognition of this mistake, a correction was included on the website of the local Oxford branch of the International Brigades Memorial Trust.

References 

International Brigades
History books about Spain
Biographies (books)
2015 non-fiction books
Spanish Civil War books